Artem Andreyevich Dyatlov (22 May 1989, Tashkent) is a Uzbekistani hurdler. At the 2012 Summer Olympics, he competed in the Men's 400 metres hurdles.

References

1989 births
Living people
Sportspeople from Tashkent
Uzbekistani male hurdlers
Olympic athletes of Uzbekistan
Athletes (track and field) at the 2012 Summer Olympics
Athletes (track and field) at the 2014 Asian Games
Asian Games competitors for Uzbekistan